The 2016 Open Engie de Touraine was a professional tennis tournament played on indoor hard courts. It was the 12th edition of the tournament and part of the 2016 ITF Women's Circuit, offering a total of $50,000 in prize money. It took place in Joué-lès-Tours, France, on 17–23 October 2016.

Singles main draw entrants

Seeds 

 1 Rankings as of 10 October 2016.

Other entrants 
The following player received a wildcard into the singles main draw:
  Manon Arcangioli
  Lou Brouleau
  Elixane Lechemia
  Margot Yerolymos

The following players received entry from the qualifying draw:
  Théo Gravouil
  Diāna Marcinkēviča
  Sviatlana Pirazhenka
  Alena Tarasova

The following players received entry by a lucky loser spot:
  Emmanuelle Salas

Champions

Singles

 Maryna Zanevska def.  Elena Gabriela Ruse, 6–3, 6–3

Doubles

 Ivana Jorović /  Lesley Kerkhove def.  Alexandra Cadanțu /  Ekaterina Yashina, 6–3, 7–5

External links 
 2016 Open Engie de Touraine at ITFtennis.com
 Official website 

2016 ITF Women's Circuit
2016 in French tennis
Open de Touraine